Selatrað is a village on the west coast of the Faroese island of Eysturoy in Sjóvar Municipality. The name Selatrað refers to a breeding place for seals.

The 2010 population was 38. Its postal code is FO 497. The village's church, the first in the archipelago made from concrete, was built in 1927. The third biggest plantation in the Faroe Islands is in Selatrað. It was severely damaged in a hurricane in 1988, destroying  2/3 of it. However the biggest trees (20m in height) survived.

Selatrað was once the parliamentary meeting place for the whole of Eysturoy.

References

External links
Danish site with photographs of Selatrað

See also
 List of towns in the Faroe Islands

Populated places in the Faroe Islands